Georgine Loacker, S.S.S.F. (May 27, 1926 – August 3, 2013) was an American scholar. She was internationally recognized as an assessment scholar, and founded the Alverno College ability-based curriculum.

Biography
Georgine Loacker, S.S.S.F. was born and raised in Chicago, Illinois. She graduated from Alverno College in 1946 and began working at the college in 1957. She left temporarily while she completed her doctorate in English from the University of Chicago. She worked with a team of Alverno College faculty in the early 1970s to develop Alverno's ability-based curriculum.

References

1926 births
2013 deaths
People from Chicago
University of Chicago alumni
Alverno College alumni
Alverno College faculty